Appias sabina, the Sabine albatross or albatross white, is a butterfly of the family Pieridae. It is found in Africa. The habitat consists of forests.

Adults are on wing year-round.

The larvae feed on Drypetes gerrardi, Drypetes ugandensis, Ritchiea fragrans, Phyllanthus, and Boscia species

Subspecies
Appias sabina sabina (western Uganda to Zaire, Nigeria, Sierra Leone)
Appias sabina comorensis Talbot, 1943 (Comoro Islands)
Appias sabina confusa (Butler, 1872) (Madagascar)
Appias sabina udei Suffert, 1904 (northern Kenya (Mount Marsabit) to Malawi and eastern Zimbabwe (Chirinda))

References

Seitz, A. Die Gross-Schmetterlinge der Erde 13: Die Afrikanischen Tagfalter. Plate XIII 11
Seitz, A. Die Gross-Schmetterlinge der Erde 13: Die Afrikanischen Tagfalter. Plate XIII 12

Appias (butterfly)
Butterflies of Africa
Butterflies described in 1865
Taxa named by Baron Cajetan von Felder
Taxa named by Rudolf Felder